Chlidichthys is a genus of ray-finned fishes from the western and central Indian Ocean, it is part of the subfamily Pseudoplesiopinae which in turn is a constituent subfamily of the dottyback family, the Pseudochromidae. Within the Pseudoplesiopinae, Chlidichthys is regarded as a sister taxon to Pectinochromis.

Species
The following species are classified in the genus Chlidichthys:

 Chlidichthys abruptus Lubbock, 1977 (St Brandon's dottyback)
 Chlidichthys auratus Lubbock, 1975 (Golden dottyback)
 Chlidichthys bibulus (J.L.B. Smith, 1954) (Nosey dottyback)
 Chlidichthys cacatuoides A.C. Gill & Randall, 1994 (Cockatoo dottyback)
 Chlidichthys chagosensis A.C.Gill & Edwards, 2004 (Chagos dottyback)
 Chlidichthys clibanarius A.C.Gill & Edwards, 2004 (Chainmail dottyback)
 Chlidichthys foudioides A.C.Gill & Edwards, 2004 (Fody dottyback)
 Chlidichthys inornatus Lubbock, 1976
 Chlidichthys johnvoelckeri J.L.B. Smith, 1953 (Cerise dottyback)
 Chlidichthys pembae J.L.B. Smith, 1954
 Chlidichthys randalli Lubbock, 1977
 Chlidichthys rubiceps Lubbock, 1975
 Chlidichthys smithae Lubbock, 1977

References

Pseudoplesiopinae